Shisanling Town is a town located in the norther part of Changping District, Beijing, China. Situated at the immediate south of Taihang Mountain Range, Shisanling shares border with Jingzhuang Town and Dazhuangke Township in the north, Yanshou Town in the east, Cuicun and Nanshao Towns in the southeast, Chengbei and Chengnan Subdistricts in the south, and Nankou Town in the west. In 2020, census counted 34,085 residents living within the town.

The name of the town refers to the 13 Ming tombs within the administrative boundary of the town.

History

Administrative divisions 

By 2021, Shisanling Town was composed of 40 subdivisions, with 2 communities, and 38 villages:

Landmark 

 Ming tombs

Gallery

See also 

 List of township-level divisions of Beijing

References 

Changping District
Towns in Beijing